Marcus Björk may refer to:

 Marcus Björk (figure skater) (born 1994), Swedish figure skater
 Marcus Björk (ice hockey) (born 1997), Swedish ice hockey player